Nicolas-Gerrit Kühn (born 1 January 2000) is a German professional footballer who plays as a winger and forward for Austrian Bundesliga club Rapid Wien.

Club career

Early years
Born in Wunstorf, Hanover Region, Kühn began playing football at TSV Klein Heidorn and 1. FC Wunstorf, before joining the youth academy of FC St. Pauli, where he played for two years. In 2011, Kühn moved to Hannover 96, where he joined the U13 team. In the 2014–15 season, at the age of 15, he had already made two appearances for their U17 team in the Under 17 Bundesliga. For the 2015–16 season, Kühn moved to the U17 team of RB Leipzig, for whom he scored 18 goals in 22 appearances in the Under 17 Bundesliga. In the 2016–17 season, the striker scored 6 goals in 13 matches in the Under 17 Bundesliga, but fell out with a high ankle sprain. Upon his return for the second half of the season, he was already a part of the team competing in the Under 19 Bundesliga. In the 2017–18 season he was permanently moved up to the U19-team, for whom he also competed in the UEFA Youth League, and regularly trained with the first team.

Ajax
Kühn signed for Dutch club Ajax from RB Leipzig in January 2018 for a fee of €2 million. He became part of the second team, Jong Ajax, making 5 appearances in the second-tier Eerste Divisie in the 2017–18 season as the team became league champions. He was also utilised for the U19-team. In the 2018–19 season, Kühn made 21 appearances in the Eerste Divisie, in which he scored 5 goals. He also made 6 appearances for the U19s in the UEFA Youth League, in which he scored 6 goals, and 5 appearances in the domestic under-19 league, where he scored 2 goals. In the first half of the 2019–20 season, Kühn made 17 Eerste Divisie appearances in which he scored 3 goals.

Bayern Munich
In January 2020 he moved on loan to FC Bayern Munich for six months. The move was made permanent on 14 July 2020, when Kühn signed a three-year contract  and was placed in the reserve team Bayern Munich II.

In June 2021 he moved on loan for the 2021–22 season to Erzgebirge Aue, with an option to purchase, however the team was relegated and did not activate the option.

Rapid Wien
In May 2022 it was announced that he would leave Bayern Munich, being transferred to Austrian Bundesliga club Rapid Wien for a €500,000 reported fee.

International career
Kühn has played at every youth age group for Germany from under-15 to under-19.

Style of play
Kühn was described by the Bundesliga website as "a player who loves nothing more than to have the ball at his feet and dribble at his opponents, Kühn resembles a Coman type of player. With a high level of confidence, Kühn is not afraid to take risks by seeking one-on-ones and taking on his opponents, using his pace and excellent close control to deadly effect. Kühn is also a rather rare commodity in being left-footed, but he is equally at home on the left or the right, or even behind the strikers as a support man."

Honours 
Jong Ajax
 Eerste Divisie: 2017–18

Bayern Munich II
 3. Liga: 2019–20

Individual
 Fritz Walter Medal U19 Gold Medal: 2019

References

2000 births
Living people
German footballers
Association football forwards
Association football wingers
Germany youth international footballers
RB Leipzig players
Jong Ajax players
AFC Ajax players
FC Bayern Munich footballers
FC Erzgebirge Aue players
Eerste Divisie players
3. Liga players
2. Bundesliga players
German expatriate footballers
German expatriate sportspeople in the Netherlands
Expatriate footballers in the Netherlands
SK Rapid Wien players
German expatriate sportspeople in Austria
Expatriate footballers in Austria